National Reconciliation Week is intended to celebrate Indigenous history and culture in Australia and foster reconciliation discussion and activities. It started as the Week of Prayer for Reconciliation in 1993, developing into National Reconciliation Week in 1996.

History and background

The Council for Aboriginal Reconciliation (CAR) was created by the Australian Parliament under the Council for Aboriginal Reconciliation Act 1991 and was funded with a sunset clause till 2001.

The 1993 Week of Prayer for Reconciliation was initiated and supported by major religious groups in Australia. In 1996 the CAR held the first National Reconciliation Week, The start and end dates, 27 May and 3 June, were chosen for their historical significance: the former marks the anniversary of the 1967 referendum in Australia, and the latter marks the anniversary of High Court of Australia judgement on the landmark Mabo v Queensland case of 1992, which recognised native title in Australia for the first time.

In 2000, an estimated 250,000 people walked across the Sydney Harbour Bridge, and in Brisbane, the People’s Walk for Reconciliation attracted an estimated 70,000

Description
National Reconciliation Week is now organised by Reconciliation Australia, a not-for-profit organisation created to take over the duties of CAR. The week is intended to celebrate the history and culture of Aboriginal and Torres Strait Islander people in Australia, and foster reconciliation discussion and activities.

The day before the start of the week, 26 May, is National Sorry Day, first held in Sydney in 1998 and now commemorated annually to honour the Stolen Generations.

Reconciliation Day

Reconciliation Day is a public holiday in the Australian Capital Territory marking the start of National Reconciliation Week. It is held on the first Monday after or on 27 May, the anniversary of the 1967 referendum. It was held for the first time on 28 May 2018.

See also
 NAIDOC Week, held annually in the same week as International Day of the World's Indigenous Peoples.
Reconciliation in Australia

References

Further reading

External links

Australian Aboriginal culture
Indigenous Australian politics
May observances
June observances